.sz is the Internet country code top-level domain (ccTLD) for Eswatini. The Eswatini ISP Association ("SISPA") is responsible for assigning .SZ domain names.

The two-letter abbreviation refers to Swaziland, the country's former name from 1968 to 2018.

Second level domains

There are four second-level domains:
 co.sz: Commercial entities  
 ac.sz: Academic institutions  
 org.sz: Non-commercial organizations
 gov.sz: Reserved for government usage

External links
 IANA .sz whois information
 .sz domain registration website
 A-Z directory of .sz domains 

Country code top-level domains
Telecommunications in Eswatini
Computer-related introductions in 1993

sv:Toppdomän#S